This is a list of current state leaders ordered by their continuous tenure in a position of national leadership. For countries in which the head of state and head of government are separate, both offices are listed. For leaders who held the same office prior to their state's independence, the start of their tenure is used, not independence. For a list of heads of state taking dates of independence into account, see List of heads of state by diplomatic precedence.

Acting presidents are included in this list, but if a leader has non-consecutive terms, only the current period of service is listed.

States where head of state differs from head of government are mainly parliamentary systems. Often a leader holds both positions in presidential systems or dictatorships. Some states have semi-presidential systems where the head of government role is fulfilled by both the listed head of government and the head of state.

List of state leaders by date of assuming office

Prior to 2000

2000s

2010–2014

2015–2017

2018–2019

2020

2021

2022

2023

List of upcoming leaders

See also 
List of current heads of state and government
List of current prime ministers by date of assumption of office
List of heads of state by diplomatic precedence
List of oldest living state leaders
Lists of state leaders by age
List of current presidents of legislatures

Notes 

State leaders